Falmouth Historic District is a national historic district located at Falmouth, Stafford County, Virginia. The district includes 29 contributing buildings in the historic core of the town of Falmouth. Notable buildings include Basil Gordon Warehouse, Customs House, the Double House, Highway Assembly of God Church, old Post Office, Calvary Pentecostal Tabernacle, the Tavern, Tavern Keeper's House, Union Methodist Church, Master Hobby School, and the Counting House.  Located in the district are the separately listed Gari Melchers Home, Carlton, Clearview and Conway House.

It was listed on the National Register of Historic Places in 1970.

Gallery

References

External links
Fredericksburg, Stafford, Spotsylvania Historical Markers: Historic Falmouth E-47

Buildings and structures in Stafford County, Virginia
Historic districts in Northern Virginia
Historic districts on the National Register of Historic Places in Virginia
National Register of Historic Places in Stafford County, Virginia
Federal architecture in Virginia